Cecilia Muñoz (born July 27, 1962) is an American political advisor who served as Director of the White House Domestic Policy Council under President Obama, a position she held for five years. Prior to that, she served as the White House Director of Intergovernmental Affairs for three years. 

Before working for the White House, she was Senior Vice President for the Office of Research, Advocacy and Legislation at the National Council of La Raza (NCLR), the largest Latino advocacy organization in the United States. At NCLR, she supervised all legislative and advocacy activities conducted by NCLR policy staff. She was also the Chair of the Board of the Center for Community Change and served on the U.S. Programs Board of the Open Society Institute and on the boards of directors of the Atlantic Philanthropies and the National Immigration Forum. In 2000, she was named a MacArthur Fellow for her work on civil rights and immigration. 

She was featured in several episodes of the documentary series How Democracy Works Now: Twelve Stories, and she contributed a chapter to West Wingers: Stories from the Dream Chasers, Change Makers, and Hope Creators Inside the Obama White House discussing her experiences in the Obama White House.

Early life and education
Muñoz was born in Detroit, Michigan the youngest of four children. Her parents had moved to the United States from La Paz, Bolivia, so that her father, an automotive engineer, could attend the University of Michigan. When she was three, the family moved to Livonia, Michigan, a Detroit suburb. Muñoz attended the University of Michigan in Ann Arbor. As a volunteer, she tutored Hispanic American inmates at the state prison in nearby Jackson, Michigan. She earned undergraduate degrees in English and Latin American studies in 1984. Following graduation, Muñoz continued her education at the University of California at Berkeley, where she earned a master's degree, also in Latin American studies.

Career
As Director of Intergovernmental Affairs, Muñoz was the Obama Administration's main liaison with state, local and tribal governments, including the Big Seven organizations that represent most state and local officials, including the Council of State Governments, the National Governors Association and the National Conference of State Legislatures. She co-chaired the White House Task Force on Puerto Rico's Political Status, where her work prompted several politicians from both sides to celebrate her designation as head of the Domestic Policy Council.

She was featured in the documentary film Last Best Chance, story twelve of the series How Democracy Works Now, from filmmakers Shari Robertson and Michael Camerini. A cut of the film premiered on HBO in March 2010, under the title The Senator's Bargain.

Muñoz appeared in Mountains and Clouds, story two in the series How Democracy Works Now, where she and Frank Sharry discuss being at a potential "watershed moment" for comprehensive immigration reform, in 2001. Additionally, she was featured in Ain't the AFL for Nothin', story seven in the series where she is shown working on a proposal for immigration, in 2003.

In 2020, Muñoz authored More than Ready, an autobiography about her life and tenure in the White House.

Muñoz works at New America, a think tank based in Washington, D.C.

In November 2020, Muñoz was announced as a member of Joe Biden's transition staff.

Personal life
Muñoz is married to Amit Pandya, a human rights lawyer. They have two daughters.

See also
 How Democracy Works Now: Twelve Stories
 Immigration

References

Further reading

"Congress Weakens Immigration Policies." Associated Press. December 1, 1997.
Eversley, Melanie. "A Leading Authority: Detroit Native Speaks Out Proudly for Latino Issues." Detroit Free Press. November 3, 1997.
Hayward, Brad. "Welfare Reform Has Legal Immigrants Wary." Sacramento Bee. September 4, 1996.
"Immigrants Add $10 Billion to Economy Annually, Study Says." Washington Times. May 19, 1997.
McDonnell, Patrick J. "Proposed Cutbacks in Aid Alarm Legal Immigrants." Los Angeles Times. July 30, 1996, p. A1.
Navarrette, Ruben, Jr. "Groups Ask for Cuts in Immigrants." Arizona Republic. November 11, 1997.
Sample, Herbert A. "Activists Want Food Stamps Restored to Immigrants." Orange County Register. August 22, 1997, p. A15.
Sun, Lena H. "White House Queries Activist on Citizenship." Washington Post. March 21, 1997, p. A28.

External links 

1962 births
American people of Bolivian descent
Living people
MacArthur Fellows
Michigan Democrats
Obama administration personnel
Politicians from Detroit
University of California, Berkeley alumni
University of Michigan alumni